Neotaracia is a genus of tephritid  or fruit flies in the family Tephritidae.

Species
Neotaracia imox (Bates, 1934)
Neotaracia plaumanni (Hering, 1938)
Neotaracia unimacula Foote, 1979

References

Tephritinae
Tephritidae genera
Diptera of South America
Diptera of North America